Manutahi is a small community in south Taranaki, New Zealand, situated on SH3 about halfway between the towns of Hāwera and Patea. The area was a significant site in the New Zealand Wars of the 1860s. The major industries in Manutahi today are dairy farming, and oil and gas production.

The local Manutahi Marae and its Taumaha meeting house are affiliated with the Ngāti Tākou hapū of Te Pakakohi.

References

South Taranaki District
Populated places in Taranaki